Freshwater is a suburb of Cairns in the Cairns Region, Queensland, Australia.

The suburb was once a separate town in the Shire of Mulgrave but was amalgamated into the City of Cairns, which subsequently was amalgamated into the Cairns Region.

History

Freshwater is in the traditional lands of the Yidiny people.

European occupation along the banks of the Barron River began in late 1876 when the Douglas Track and Smith's Track were established around Lumley Hill and Mount Whitfield, linking the new port of Cairns to the Hodgkinson goldfields. Chinese market gardeners moved into the area in the late 1870s, after exhausting their chances on the Hodgkinson Goldfields, leased small plots from the landowners, successfully growing rice, bananas, pineapples and other tropical crops.

The need for a railway from the Herberton mines to the coast, resulted in the construction between Herberton and Cairns (now the Tablelands railway line). The first 8 miles of this railway went from Cairns to Redlynch crossing over Freshwaster Creek . The development of the railway line encouraged land developers to release a land subdivision called Richmond Park Estate near the railway line and Freshwater Creek, which was sold from 1886 with advertising featuring the forthcoming "Richmond Park railway station" and its ten-minute rail journey to Cairns. When the railway line opened in late 1887, there were a number of railway sidings along the line: Stratford (5 miles from Cairns), Lily Bank (6 miles from Cairns), and Richmond (7 miles from Cairns). Richmond Siding was renamed Freshwater Siding (later Freshwater railway station) in January 1890.

A rice mill was established on the Lower Freshwater Creek and was being successfully operated by local man, Joseph Kipling in 1891. Chinese farmers grew rice in the adjacent fields.

Freshwater Provisional School opened on 20 August 1896. On 1 January 1909, it became Freshwater State School. Due to low students numbers, it closed on August 1918 but re-opened on 21 September 1923.

Freshwater Post Office opened by April 1925 (a receiving office, earlier named Stratford, had been open from 1897).

Mason Memorial Methodist Church opened on Saturday 8 April 1939. It was called the Mason Memorial church because of the £60 pound bequest left by the late Mrs Mason to build the church. It is at 25 Vallely Street and is now in private ownership in use as a house.

On Sunday 20 November 1938, Bishop John Heavey officially opened and blessed the new Sacred Heart Catholic Church.

Education 
Freshwater State School is a government primary (Prep-6) school for boys and girls at 10 Corkill Street. In 2017, the school had an enrolment of 738 students with 50 teachers (43 full-time equivalent) and 25 non-teaching staff (16 full-time equivalent). In 2018, the school had an enrolment of 709 students with 52 teachers (46 full-time equivalent) and 24 non-teaching staff (16 full-time equivalent).

There is no secondary school in Freshwater. The nearest government secondary school is Redlynch State College in neighbouring Redlynch to the south-west.

Amenities 
Bunny Adair Park on Lower Freshwater Road (once in Freshwater but now in Barron) is named after Bunny Adair. The park has equestrian facilities and is home to the Freshwater Pony Club.

The Freshwater branch of the Queensland Country Women's Association meets at the CWA Hall on the corner of Kamerunga Road and Old Smithfield Road (opposite the Freshwater railway station). The branch was established in 1937 and held its meetings in the home of first president Mrs Odgen. In 1940, the railway square became available for recreational use and the CWA purchased the present site for their hall. However, it was not until after World War II that the branch focussed on raising funds for the building, having devoted their wartime activities to the manufacture of camouflage nets and contributions to the war effort. The building was completed in 1955. In additional to CWA activities, the hall is used for by other community groups and for private parties.

Sacred Heart Catholic Church is at 15 Duffy Street. It is within the Northern Beaches Parish of the Roman Catholic Diocese of Cairns.

Attractions

The Kuranda Scenic Railway has a stop at the Freshwater railway station, which is just outside the current suburb boundaries in the neighbouring suburb of Barron.

In 2009 for the Q150 commemorations, the Stratford and Freshwater Community Association built a heritage trail, with 22 signposted sites in Freshwater and 29 signposted sites in the neighbouring suburb of Stratford.

Notable people 

 Bunny Adair, Member of the Queensland Legislative Assembly and publican at the Freshwater Hotel.

References

Further reading
 Freshwater Heritage Trail brochure by Cairns Regional Council
Stratford Heritage Trail brochure by Cairns Regional Council

External links 

Suburbs of Cairns